Pascalis may refer to:

 Claudio De Pascalis (born 1982), Italian footballer
 Claude Kévers-Pascalis (1920–2016), Belgian writer, historian and engineer
 Pascalis Romanus (or Paschal the Roman), a 12th-century priest, medical expert, and dream theorist

See also 
 Paschalis (disambiguation)
 Pascali (disambiguation)
 Pascal (disambiguation)
 Pasqual (disambiguation)
 Pasquale (disambiguation)
 Pascual (disambiguation)